Robert Wardlaw (5 August 1889 – 27 June 1964) was an Australian politician. Born in Mathinna, Tasmania, he was educated at state schools before serving in the military 1914–1920. He returned to become a shopkeeper at Ringarooma and later a farmer and pig breeder. He was President of the Tasmanian Farmers' Federation 1949-1951 and was also a company director. In 1953 he was elected to the Australian Senate as a Liberal Senator for Tasmania. He held the seat until his retirement in 1961.

Wardlaw died in 1964, aged 74.

References

Liberal Party of Australia members of the Parliament of Australia
Members of the Australian Senate for Tasmania
Members of the Australian Senate
1889 births
1964 deaths
20th-century Australian politicians